Frey's procedure is a surgical technique used in the treatment of chronic pancreatitis in which the diseased portions of the pancreas head are cored out. A lateral pancreaticojejunostomy (LRLPJ) is then performed in which a loop of the jejunum is then mobilized and attached over the exposed pancreatic duct to allow better drainage of the pancreas, including its head.

Indication
Frey's operation is indicated on patients with chronic pancreatitis who have "head dominant" disease.

Comparison to Puestow procedure
Compared with a Puestow procedure, a Frey's procedure allows for better drainage of the pancreatic head.

Complications
Postoperative complications after LRLPJ are usually septic in nature and are likely to occur more often in patients in whom endoscopic pancreatic stenting has been performed before surgical intervention. Pancreatic endocrine insufficiency occurs in 60% of patients.

Eponym
It is named for the American surgeon Charles Frederick Frey (b.1929) of Michigan, who first described it in 1987.

References

Further reading
 Bapat RD, Satish R R, Kantharia CV. Choice Of Surgical Procedures for Chronic Pancreatitis. Bombay Hospital Journal. January 2001. Available at: https://web.archive.org/web/20120207122247/http://www.bhj.org/journal/2001_4301_jan/reviews_175.htm. Accessed on: October 15, 2007.

External links
Frey's procedure (drawing) - Bombay Hospital Journal.

Accessory digestive gland surgery